was a noted Japanese poet and novelist.

Kō was born in Yatsushiro, Kumamoto and graduated from the Department of English Literature of Meiji Gakuin University. He was arrested as a political offender during World War II, and after the war started to write I novels. Kō received the 1969 Yomiuri Prize for Ichijō no hikari, as well as the Ministry of Education's Art Encouragement Prize.

English translations 
 "Black Market Blues", in Murder in Japan: Japanese Stories of Crime and Detection, John L. Apostolou and Martin Harry Greenberg, editors, New York: Dembner Books, 1987. .

References

Sources 
 Yoshikazu Kataoka, Introduction to Contemporary Japanese Literature: 1956-1970, Kokusai Bunka Shinkōkai, 1972, page 107.
 J-Pitch article

1988 deaths
1906 births
Meiji Gakuin University alumni
20th-century Japanese poets
Yomiuri Prize winners
People from Yatsushiro, Kumamoto
Writers from Kumamoto Prefecture